Tyler Downs (born July 19, 2003) is an American competitive Olympic diver and social media personality.

Early life and education
Tyler Downs was born on July 19, 2003 in St. Louis, Missouri.  He is youngest of seven children born to Theresa and Donnie Downs. He attended Laurel Springs Online School, graduating in 2021.

Diving career
Downs is a six time U.S. junior national diving champion.  Downs competed at the 2015, 2017, and 2019 U.S. Junior Pan American Games. He competed at the 2019 Sagamihara and Beijing World Series. At the 2018 World Junior Diving Championships, he was the silver medalist in 1-meter. At the 2019 Junior Pan American Championships, he won gold on the 3-meter and synchronized 3-meter and bronze on the 1-meter and platform.

Downs qualified to represent the United States in the Men's 3 metre springboard at the 2021 Summer Olympics in Tokyo after triumphing in the event at the U.S. Olympic trials and in the process defeating his hero, David Boudia.  However, in Tokyo he failed to proceed beyond the preliminary round, finishing 23rd in a field of 29 divers.

TikTok personality
Downs has a large presence on TikTok with over 931,000 followers.

Personal life
Downs lives in Ballwin, Missouri. He committed to attending Purdue University in West Lafayette, Indiana in the Fall 2021, to compete for the "Boilermakers" swimming and diving squad.

References

American male divers
Living people
Sportspeople from St. Louis
2003 births
People from Ballwin, Missouri
Olympic divers of the United States
Divers at the 2020 Summer Olympics